Moosa is both a surname and a given name. It is the Arabic name for Moses (see also Moses in Islam). Notable people with the name include:

Surname:
Mohammed Valli Moosa (born 1957), South African politician
Ahmed Shafeeq Ibrahim Moosa (born 1968), Maldivian scientist and politician
Naushad Moosa (born 1971), Indian footballer
Riaad Moosa (born 1977), South African comedian and actor
Zane Moosa (born 1968), South African footballer

Given name:
Moosa AbdulRahman Hassan (died 1987), Omani businessman
Moosa Ali Jaleel (born 1960), Maldivian military officer
Moosa Bin Shamsher (born 1945), Bangladeshi businessman
Moosa Manik (born 1963), Maldivian footballer and manager
Moosa Moolla (born 1934), South African activist and diplomat
Moosa Raza (born 1937), Indian civil servant
Moosa Yaamin (born 1992), Maldivian footballer

See also
 Moosa (India), a village in Mansa District of Punjab State, India
 Musa (disambiguation)
Surnames of Maldivian origin
Maldivian-language surnames